James Lamont (born 1875, date of death unknown) was a Scottish professional footballer who played in the 19th century for Bedminster and Bristol Rovers.

Lamont was born in Cowlairs in Scotland playing for Partick Thistle. Moving south he played for Bedminster in 1898–99, one of the teams that later merged to form Bristol City, in the Southern League before joining Bristol Rovers in 1899. In his one season with Rovers he played 27 times as a half back in the then-professional Southern League, scoring twice.

Sources

1875 births
Year of death missing
Footballers from Glasgow
Scottish footballers
Association football midfielders
Southern Football League players
Bristol Rovers F.C. players
Bedminster F.C. players
People from Springburn